Zymology, also known as zymurgy, is an applied science that studies the biochemical process of fermentation and its practical uses. Common topics include the selection of fermenting yeast and bacteria species and their use in brewing, wine making, fermenting milk, and the making of other fermented foods.

Fermentation 

Fermentation can be simply defined, in this context, as the conversion of sugar molecules into ethanol and carbon dioxide by yeast.

 

Fermentation practices have led to the discovery of ample microbial and antimicrobial cultures on fermented foods and products.

History 

French chemist Louis Pasteur was the first 'zymologist' when in 1857 he connected yeast to fermentation. Pasteur originally defined fermentation as "respiration without air".

Pasteur performed careful research and concluded:

The German Eduard Buchner, winner of the 1907 Nobel Prize in chemistry, later determined that fermentation was actually caused by a yeast secretion, which he termed 'zymase'.

The research efforts undertaken by the Danish Carlsberg scientists greatly accelerated understanding of yeast and brewing. The Carlsberg scientists are generally acknowledged as having jump-started the entire field of molecular biology.

Products 

 All alcoholic drinks including beer, cider, kombucha, kvass, mead, perry, tibicos, wine, pulque, hard liquors (brandy, rum, vodka, sake, schnapps), and soured by-products including vinegar and alegar
 Yeast leavened breads including sourdough, salt-rising bread, and others
 Cheese and some dairy products including kefir and yogurt
 Chocolate
 Dishes including fermented fish, such as garum, surströmming, and Worcestershire sauce
 Some vegetables such as kimchi, some types of pickles (most are not fermented though), and sauerkraut
 A wide variety of fermented edibles made from soy beans, including fermented bean paste, nattō, tempeh, and soya sauce

Notes

References

Sources

External links 
 Winemaking: Fundamentals of winemaking: zymology
 Life Sciences: List of life sciences

Biochemistry
Brewing
Oenology